Actias laotiana is a moth in the family Saturniidae. It is found in Laos.

References

Laotiana
Moths described in 1936
Moths of Asia